The 2022–23 season is the 79th season in the history of Lille OSC and their 23rd consecutive season in the top flight. The club are participating in Ligue 1 and Coupe de France. The season covers the period from 1 July 2022 to 30 June 2023.

Players

Current squad

Out on loan

Transfers

In

Out

Pre-season and friendlies

Competitions

Overall record

Ligue 1

League table

Results summary

Results by round

Matches
The league fixtures were announced on 17 June 2022.

Coupe de France

Statistics

Appearances and goals

|-
! colspan=14 style=background:#dcdcdc; text-align:center| Goalkeepers

|-
! colspan=14 style=background:#dcdcdc; text-align:center| Defenders

|-
! colspan=14 style=background:#dcdcdc; text-align:center| Midfielders

|-
! colspan=14 style=background:#dcdcdc; text-align:center| Forwards

|-
! colspan=14 style=background:#dcdcdc; text-align:center| Players transferred out during the season

References

Lille OSC seasons
Lille